Indonesian Medical Olympiad (IMO) is an Indonesian academic competition on medical knowledge that is presented by the Indonesian Medical Students' Executive Board Association, a member of the International Federation of Medical Students' Associations. IMO is the biggest academic competition for medical students of Indonesia, and has been named National Medical Challenge (2010) and National Medical Olympiad (2011).

The champion of this competition is awarded trophies from the Minister of Education and Culture, the Minister of Health, and the Indonesian Association of Medical Institutions, along with millions of rupiah.

Host
Since 2010, IMO has taken place in Jogjakarta (2010), hosted by Muhammadiyah University of Yogyakarta; Surabaya (2011), hosted by Airlangga University, Malang (2012), hosted by Brawijaya University and Surabaya (2013), hosted by Airlangga University. In 2014, Indonesia Medical Olympiad was held in Padang, hosted by Universitas Andalas. In 2015. IMO was hosted by Hasanuddin University in Makassar. In 2016, IMO was held in Universitas Pelita Harapan in Jakarta. The latest IMO 2017 was hosted by Universitas Sumatera Utara in Medan

Participants
Participants of IMO are delegations from medical institutions in Indonesia.

See also
Indonesia National Science Olympiad

References

External links
 Official website
 Partner website

Youth science
Student events
Medical competitions
Education in Indonesia
Science education